Gryllus ovisopis, the taciturn wood cricket, is a species of cricket in the subfamily Gryllinae. It is found in North America.

References

ovisopis
Articles created by Qbugbot
Insects described in 1974